Shamakhi FK is an Azerbaijani professional football club based in Shamakhi, that currently competes in the Azerbaijan Premier League. The club has won the Premier League title twice.

History

Early years (1997–2004)
The club has been functioning since 1997, initially as an amateur side that shared its name with Khazar University, the first private university in Azerbaijan, which founded the club. In 1999, Khazar University began to play in the Azerbaijan Premier League, finishing eleventh. In subsequent years, Inter finished in 7th place (2000/01 season) and 3rd place (2003–04 season).

In the 2003–04 season the team finished in fourth place, thereby qualifying for the UEFA Intertoto Cup for the first time. In the first round of the 2004 UEFA Intertoto Cup, they defeated Bregenz of Austria 3:0 on a forfeiture in the first leg, and 2:1 in the second leg. In the second round, they played Tampere United of Finland, losing the first leg 0:3; winning the return leg, played in Baku, 1:0; but going out on aggregate 1:3.

The Double and Tskhadadze years (2004–2014)

In the summer of 2004, all rights of the Khazar University club were transferred to the newly created Inter Baku Professional Football Club, and the team participated in the 13th championship of the Azerbaijani Premier League under the name of Inter Baku.  Later in 2004, certain structural changes were made in the club's management, and Inter Baku was renamed the Inter Professional Club, finishing the 2004–2005 season in seventh place. Inter's progression up the standings continued in the 14th iteration of the Azerbaijan Premier League when Inter finished in fourth place.

The club finished fourth again in 2006–07, and first in 2007–08.  Following its championship season, Inter qualified for its first-ever appearance in the UEFA Champions League in 2008 and advanced to the second qualifying round by defeating Rabotnički of the Republic of Macedonia on away goals.

2009 saw Inter Baku retain the Azerbaijan Premier League title, securing it for the second time in the club's history. The club's Champions League campaign was less successful – barely losing to Lech Poznań away on penalties. In 2011, Inter Baku also managed to win the CIS Cup after defeating Shakhtyor Soligorsk in the final.

In 2012, the club recorded an Azerbaijani record for the biggest win in a European competition by beating Narva Trans 5–0 in Estonia. The club had started the 2013–14 season with a three-game losing streak, setting a record for worst start to a season in its history. However, the team managed to clinch second spot in the league.

Downturn and financial difficulties of Inter Baku (2015–2017)
During the 2015–16 season, Inter started experiencing financial difficulties at the same time with its main sponsor, The International Bank of Azerbaijan. In December 2015, the club's president Georgi Nikolov was replaced by Rashad Gasimov. On 31 March 2016, Inter Baku were banned from participating in the next UEFA club competition that they would qualify for in the next three seasons, covering the 2016/17, 2017/18 and 2018/19 seasons.

The situation continued during the 2016–17 season as Inter struggled to pay salaries to its players and make new transfers. Despite that, Inter was able to claim the bronze medals in the national championship and reach the semi-finals stage in the Cup. At the end of the season, IBA announced that it would no longer sponsor the club and this led to new changes in the administration. Zaur Akhundov, former director of the National Futzal Federation, was appointed as the head of the supervisory board and Ramish Maliyev became the new executive director of the club. Despite the rumors about the liquidation, Inter was able to find sponsorship for the 2017–18 season and play in the Europe League where it eliminated Serbian Mladost Lučani in the first qualifying round before getting eliminated by Fola Esch in the second round.

Keshla FK (2017–2022)
On 28 October 2017, Inter Baku PIK officially changed its name to Keshla FK. The club also replaced its logo and jersey colors. In its first match, Keshla lost 0–2 against Kapaz. The next day, the team's manager Zaur Svanadze was replaced by Ramiz Mammadov. On 25 December 2017, Keshla announced that Ramiz Mammadov had become the club's Sporting Director, with Yuriy Maksymov coming in as the club's new manager. On 17 July 2018 Maksymov was sacked as manager, with Mladen Milinković being appointed as the new manager on 25 July 2018. On 29 October 2018 Milinković was sacked as manager, with Tarlan Ahmadov being appointed as his replacement on 30 October 2018. On 8 August 2020, Ahmadov left Keşla.

On 16 August 2020, Keşla announced Yunis Huseynov being appointed as the new manager. On 24 January 2021, Huseynov resigned as manager, with Sanan Gurbanov being appointed as the clubs new manager on 25 January 2021.

Shamakhi FK (2022–present)
On 6 April 2022, the Azerbaijan Premier League approved the name change of Keşla FK to Shamakhi FK.

Domestic history

European history

Stadium

Shamakhi's home ground is Shamakhi City Stadium, which has a capacity of 2,200.

Shirt sponsor and kit manufacturer

Players

Azerbaijani teams are limited to nine players without Azerbaijani citizenship. The squad list includes only the principal nationality of each player; several non-European players on the squad have dual citizenship with an EU country.

Current squad

For recent transfers, see List of Azerbaijan football transfers summer 2022.

Club officials

Management

Coaching staff

Records

Top goalscorers

Notable managers
Information correct as of match played 23 February 2019. Only competitive matches are counted.

Notes:
P – Total of played matches
W – Won matches
D – Drawn matches
L – Lost matches
GS – Goal scored
GA – Goals against
%W – Percentage of matches won

Nationality is indicated by the corresponding FIFA country code(s).

Honours

National
Azerbaijan League
 Winners (2): 2007–08, 2009–10

Azerbaijan Cup
 Winners (2): 2017–18, 2020–21

Regional
CIS Cup
 Winners (1): 2011

References

External links
 Official Inter Baku Website
 Inter Baku at Weltfussball.de
 Inter Baku at Soccerway.com
 http://dynamicsport.eu/

 
Football clubs in Azerbaijan
Association football clubs established in 1997
Football clubs in Baku
1997 establishments in Azerbaijan